Vishnyovy is a rural locality (a settlement) in Akhtubinsky Selsoviet, Krasnoyarsky District, Astrakhan Oblast, Russia. The population was 445 as of 2010. There are 4 streets.

Geography 
Vishnyovy is located on the Akhtuba River, 60 km northwest of Krasny Yar (the district's administrative centre) by road. Bakharevsky is the nearest rural locality.

References 

Rural localities in Krasnoyarsky District, Astrakhan Oblast